Voineasa may refer to several places in Romania:

 Voineasa, Olt, a commune in Olt County
 Voineasa, Vâlcea, a commune in Vâlcea County

See also 
 Voina (disambiguation)
 Voicu, a surname
 Voinea, a surname
 Voinești (disambiguation)